Hříšice is a municipality and village in Jindřichův Hradec District in the South Bohemian Region of the Czech Republic. It has about 300 inhabitants.

Administrative parts
The village of Jersice is an administrative part of Hříšice.

References

Villages in Jindřichův Hradec District